A spaghetti strap (also called noodle strap) is a very thin shoulder strap used to support clothing, while providing minimal shoulder straps over otherwise bare shoulders. It is commonly used in garments such as swimwear, camisoles, crop tops, brassieres, sundresses, cocktail dresses, and evening gowns, so-named for its resemblance to the thin pasta strings called spaghetti.

Dress codes 
Spaghetti straps may not meet some dress codes. For example, they are not welcome at Ascot Racecourse as well as in traditionalist societies like Saudi Arabia or Afghanistan.

See also
 Halterneck
 Sleeveless shirt

References

External links
 Spaghetti strap in Movie and TV shows

Parts of clothing
1990s fashion
Undergarments
Metaphors referring to spaghetti